Meraloma Club (nicknamed the Lomas) is a Canadian rugby union team based in Vancouver, British Columbia. Founded in 1923, The Meraloma Club originated as a swim club before branching out with an array of other sports including rugby. The rugby club currently competes in the British Columbia Premier Rugby League.

History

Established in 1923 as a swim club the Meraloma Club was originally named the Mermaid Athletic Club before adding canadian football, rugby union and other sports. With the inclusion of new sports came the development of a new name. By taking "Mer" from the original Mermaids name and adding "al" from alpha, "om" from omega (the first and last letters of the Greek alphabet) and "a" from "always" that was interpreted to mean "Mermaids, first, last and always"; reflected in the club motto "Once a Meraloma, Always a Meraloma". Thus, the Mermaid Athletic Club became the Meraloma Club.

The Rugby Section of the Meraloma Club has had tremendous success, both on a team, & individual level, with numerous premiership titles for the club. Players for the Meraloma's also compete at both the Provincial & National Levels. The Meraloma's most recent Rounsefell Cup win came in 2009. The team also managed to make it to the 2011 B.C. Rugby Premier League final but eventually lost out to Castaway Wanderers RFC by a score of 20-3.

Women's sports returned to the club in 1973 after a 45-year absence, at first in the form of field-hockey and eventually, soccer, basketball, volleyball and touch football.  The club currently has over 600 active male and female members in 6 sport sections.  Over half of the members of the Meraloma Club are involved in Rugby.

Facilities

The Meraloma Club is housed in a 1923 Parks & Recreation vintage structure, on Connaught Park, Kitsilano which it continues to renovate and maintain.  A Heritage Award from the City of Vancouver was earned in 1979 for preserving architectural integrity during renovations.

Titles

Rounsefell Cup: 13
1929, 1939, 1941, 1954, 1965, 1967, 1972, 1973, 1983, 1986, 1987, 1988, 2009

See also
Vancouver Meralomas football team

References

External links
Meraloma Rugby Club

Sport in Vancouver
Rugby union teams in British Columbia